Ignazio Gladès Berzi (born 7 January 1867 in Ghirghe) was an Egyptian clergyman and the former suffragan eparch of Luxor. He was ordained in 1896, appointed in 1896, and died in 1925.

References 

Coptic Catholic bishops
1867 births
Year of death missing